Stephen Matthews may refer to:

Stephen Matthews (linguist), professor of linguistics at the University of Hong Kong
Stephen Matthews (writer), Australian author and publisher of children's books

See also
Steven Matthews, Irish Green Party politician